Sabine Rantzsch (born 8 May 1953) is a retired East German swimmer. She competed at the 1968 Summer Olympics in the 800 m freestyle event, but failed to reach the final.

References

1953 births
Living people
German female freestyle swimmers
Swimmers from Leipzig
Olympic swimmers of East Germany
Swimmers at the 1968 Summer Olympics